A fertility deity is a god or goddess associated with fertility, sex, pregnancy, childbirth, and crops. In some cases these deities are directly associated with these experiences; in others they are more abstract symbols.  Fertility rites may accompany their worship. The following is a list of fertility deities.

African
Ala, Igbo goddess of fertility
Asase Ya, Ashanti earth goddess of fertility
Deng, Dinka sky god of rain and fertility
Mbaba Mwana Waresa, Zulu goddess of fertility, rainbows, agriculture, rain, and bees
Orie, Ohafia goddess of fertility
Oshun (known as Ochún or Oxúm in Latin America) also spelled Ọṣun, is an orisha, a spirit, a deity, or a goddess that reflects one of the manifestations of God in the Ifá and Yoruba religions. She is one of the most popular and venerated orishas. Oshun is the deity of the river and fresh water, luxury and pleasure, sexuality and fertility, and beauty and love. She is connected to destiny and divination.

Ancient Egyptian

Amun, creator-god, associated with fertility
Bastet, cat goddess sometimes associated with fertility
Hathor, goddess of music, beauty, love, sexuality and fertility
Heqet, frog-goddess of fertility
Heryshaf, god of creation and fertility
Isis, goddess of motherhood, magic and fertility
Mesenet, goddess of childbirth
Min, god of fertility, reproduction, and lettuce
Osiris, god of the afterlife, the dead, and the underworld agency that granted all life, including sprouting vegetation and the fertile flooding of the Nile River
Renenutet, goddess of the true name, the harvest and fertile fields
Sobek, god of the river, warfare and fertility
Sopdet, goddess of the fertility of the soil
Tawaret, goddess of fertility and childbirth
Tefnut, goddess of water and fertility

Yoruba
Eshu
Oya

Native American
Atahensic, Iroquois goddess associated with marriage, childbirth, and feminine endeavors
Kokopelli, Hopi trickster god associated with fertility, childbirth and agriculture
Hanhepi Wi, Lakota goddess associated with the moon, motherhood, family and femininity

Aztec
Chimalma, goddess of fertility, life, death, and rebirth.
Tonacatecuhtli, god of sustenance.
Tonacacihuatl, goddess of sustenance.
Tonantzin
Coatlicue, goddess of fertility, life, death, and rebirth.
Xochipilli, god of love, art, games, beauty, dance, flowers, maize, fertility, and song.
Xochiquetzal, goddess of fertility, beauty, female sexual power, protection of young mothers, pregnancy, childbirth, and women's crafts.
Quetzalcoatl, god of fertility, wind, water, and chocolate.

Inca
Mama Ocllo, mother goddess, associated with fertility
Sara Mama, goddess of grain
Pachamama, fertility goddess who presides over planting and harvesting and causes earthquakes

Inuit
Akna, goddess of fertility and childbirth
Pukkeenegak, goddess of children, pregnancy, childbirth and the making of clothes

Mayan
Akna, goddess of motherhood and childbirth
Goddess I, goddess of eroticism, female fertility, and marriage
Ixchel, jaguar goddess of midwifery and medicine
Maya maize god, gods of maize
Maximón, a Mayan god and modern folk saint associated with crops, death, and fertility and Sight

Muiscan
Chaquén, god of sports and fertility in the religion of the Muisca

Taíno
 Atabey (goddess), mother goddess of fresh waters and fertility (of people).
 Yúcahu, masculine spirit of fertility (of crops such as Yucca) along with his mother Atabey who was his feminine counterpart.

Vodou
Ayida-Weddo, loa of fertility, rainbows and snakes
Gede, family of spirits that embody the powers of death and fertility

Asian

Arabian
Attar (god)

Armenian
Anahit,  goddess of fertility, healing, wisdom, and water
Aramazd, generous king and creator god of fertility, rain, and abundance

Canaanite
Hadad, storm (and thus rain) god responsible for crops growing, also known as Adad and Ba'al
Nikkal, goddess of fruits
Tanit, consort of Baʿal Hammon at Carthage

Chinese
 Chū Shèng Niángniáng, Goddess of Fertility
 Jiutian Xuannü, a fertility goddess as well as a deity of war and long life 
 Yúnxiāo Niángniáng, goddess of childbirth
 Qióngxiāo Niángniáng, goddess of childbirth
 Bìxiāo Niángniáng, goddess of childbirth
 Chén Jìnggū, goddess of childbirth

Filipino

Lakapati: the hermaphrodite Tagalog deity and protector of sown fields, sufficient field waters, and abundant fish catch; a major fertility deity; deity of vagrants and waifs; a patron of cultivated lands and husbandry
Ikapati: the Sambal goddess of cultivated land and fertility
Lakan-bakod: the Tagalog god of the fruits of the earth who dwells in certain plants; the god of crops; the god of rice whose hollow statues have gilded eyes, teeth, and genitals; food and wine are introduced to his mouth to secure a good crop; the protector of fences
Kukarog: the Bicolano giant who was swept by waters into the sea, where his genital can be seen as a rock jutting from the ocean
Ibabasag: the Bukidnon goddess of pregnant women

Vietnamese
Bà mụ, consisting of twelve goddesses responsible for creating each part of the child

Hittite/Hurrian
Hutellurra, Irsirra, and Tawara, goddesses of midwifery and nursing children
Shaushka, goddess of fertility, war, and healing

Indian
 
Banka-Mundi, goddess of the hunt and fertility
Bhavani, goddess of fertility
Bhumi Devi, goddess of fertility
Bhutas, young demons of fertility
Rohini, minor goddess of fertility and fortune
Prithvi, goddess of the earth and the fertility form of Bhumi
Gayatri, goddess of Vedas and adi shakti with fertility form of Savitr
Chandra, lunar god associated with fertility
Lajja Gauri, goddess associated with abundance and fertility
Manasa, snake goddess associated with fertility and prosperity
Matrikas, a group of 7-16 goddesses who are associated with fertility and motherly power.
Parvati, goddess associated with  fertility, marital felicity, devotion to the spouse, asceticism, and power
Sinivali, goddess associated with fecundity and easy birth
Yogmaya, goddess of fertility and protection against evil demons

Iranian
 Anahita: or Anahit, the divinity of "the Waters" and hence associated with fertility, healing, and wisdom
 Spenta Armaiti: or Sandaramet, female divinity associated with earth and Mother Nature
 Ashi: a divinity of fertility and fortune

Israel
Yahweh, Father God of Israel
Asherah, Mother Goddess of nature, groves & trees (exiled by Hezekiah)

Japanese
Kichijōten, goddess of happiness, fertility, and beauty
Kuebiko, god of agriculture and knowledge
Inari Ōkami, deity of fertility, rice, agriculture, foxes, and industry; this deity is of ambiguous gender and may be portrayed as male, female, or ambiguous
Shinda, fertility god of the Ainu people

Mesopotamian
Asherah, Ancient semitic goddess of motherhood and fertility
Ashratum, the wife of Amurru. Ašratum (glorified one), a cognate of Athirat
Dumuzid/Tammuz, Mesopotamian dying-&-rising god, Dumuzid-sipad (the Shepherd), husband of Inanna
Gatumdag, Sumerian fertility goddess and tutelary mother goddess of Lagash
Nanshe, Sumerian goddess of social justice, prophecy, fertility, and fishing
Sharra Itu, Identified with Asratum, later Ašrat-aḫītu (Ašratum the foreigner) or (the other Ašratum)
Inanna/Ishtar, Mesopotamian goddess of love, beauty, sex, desire, fertility, war, justice, and political power. Her symbols were lions, doves & the 8-pointed star, wife of Dumuzid

Turco-Mongol
Umay, goddess of fertility and reproduction, believed to have saved two children (one boy and one girl) from a massacre. She is believed to have offered protection and guidance to the children, who managed to raise the Turcic communities. In the form of a deer, she is accepted by the Turks to be the protective power of the race, and therefore she is called in many texts as "Mother Umay".

European

Albanian
Prende, goddess of love, beauty and fertility

Baltic
Laima, goddess of luck and fate, associated with childbirth, pregnancy, marriage, and death
Zemes māte, goddess of the earth, associated with fertility

Celtic
Brigid, Irish goddess associated with fertility, spring, healing, smithing, and poetry
Cernunnos, horned god associated with the fertility of animals and nature
Damara, fertility goddess worshiped in Britain
Damona, Gaulish fertility goddess
Epona, goddess of horses, mules, donkeys, and the fertility of these animals
Hooded Spirits, a group of deities theorised to be fertility spirits
Nantosuelta, goddess of nature, the earth, fire, and fertility
Onuava, goddess of fertility
Rosmerta, Gallo-Roman goddess of fertility and abundance

Etruscan
Fufluns, god of plant life, happiness, health, and growth in all things, equivalent to the Greek Dionysus
Thesan, goddess of the dawn, associated with the generation of life
Turan, goddess of love, fertility and vitality

Finno-Ugric
Äkräs, Finnish god of fertility
Rauni or Raun, Finnish-Estonian goddess of fertility
Peko or Pellon-Pekko, Karelian-Seto god of fertility
Metsik, West Estonian spirit of fertility
Norovava, Mordovian goddess of fertility
Šun-Šočõnava, Mari goddess of fertility and birth
Mu-Kyldyśin, Udmurt god of fertility and earth
Zarni-Ań, Komi goddess of fertility, represented by a golden woman
Babba or Aranyanya, Hungarian goddess fertility, represented by a golden woman
Kalteš-Ekwa, Ob-Ugric goddess of fertility, represented by a golden woman

Germanic
Ēostre, spring and fertility goddess; in earlier times probably a dawn goddess as her name is cognate to Eos
Freyr, god associated with peace, marriages, rain, sunshine, and fertility, both of the land and people
Freyja, a goddess associated with fertility and sister of the above god
Frigg, goddess associated with prophecy, marriage, and childbirth; in one myth, she also demonstrates a more direct connection with fertility, as a king and queen pray to her for a child
Gefjun, Danish goddess of ploughing and possibly fertility
Nerthus, earth goddess associated with fertility
Njordr, since his name is cognate with the above goddess, it's possible he was originally an earth/fertility deity before transforming into a sea god thanked for a bountiful catch
Thor, some strains of Norse paganism saw him as a fertility god (possibly due to bringing rain) and the father of Freyr and Freyja instead of Njordr

Greek
Aphrodite, goddess of beauty, love, pleasure, sexuality and procreation.
Aphaea, local goddess associated with fertility and the agricultural cycle 
Artemis, goddess of the hunt, the wilderness, wild animals, the Moon, chastity and childbirth
Demeter, goddess of the harvest, agriculture, fertility and sacred law
Dionysus, god of wine, grapes, and festivity, associated with fertility, particularly that of the vine and males

Hermes, messenger of the gods, possibly associated with male fertility
Hera, goddess of marriage, women, women's fertility, childbirth 
Ilithyia, (also called Eileithyia) goddess of childbirth and midwifery 
Pan, god of shepherds and flocks, associated with fertility, particularly that of animals
Phanes, primeval deity of procreation and new life
Priapus, rustic god of fertility, protection of livestock, fruit plants, gardens, and male genitalia
Tychon, minor daemon of fertility 
Persephone goddess of springtime growth, flowers, and vegetation

Irish
Dagda

Roman
Bacchus, Roman version of Dionysus, identified with Roman Liber, god of agricultural and male fertility
Bona Dea, goddess of fertility, healing, virginity, and women
Candelifera, goddess of childbirth
Carmenta, goddess of childbirth and prophecy
 Domidicus, the god who leads the bride home
 Domitius, the god who installs the bride
Fascinus, embodiment of the divine phallus
Fecunditas, goddess of fertility
Feronia, goddess associated with fertility and abundance
Flora, goddess of flowers and springtime
Inuus, god of sexual intercourse
 Jugatinus, the god who joins the pair in marriage
Juno, goddess of marriage and childbirth, equivalent to the Greek goddess Hera; has the epithet Lucina 
Liber, god of viniculture, wine, and male fertility, equivalent to Greek Dionysus; in archaic Lavinium, a phallic deity
Libera, female equivalent of Liber, also identified with Proserpina Romanised form of Greek Proserpina
 Manturna, the goddess who kept the bride at home
Mutunus Tutunus, phallic marriage deity associated with the Greek god Priapus
 Partula, goddess of childbirth, who determined the duration of each pregnancy
 Pertunda, goddess who enables sexual penetration of the virgin bride; an epithet of Juno
Picumnus, god of fertility, agriculture, matrimony, infants, and children
 Prema, goddess who made the bride submissive, allowing penetration;  also an epithet of Juno, who has the same function
Robigus, fertility god who protects crops against disease
 Subigus, the god who subdues the bride to the husband's will 
 Venus, goddess of beauty, love, desire, sex and fertility
 Virginiensis, the goddess who unties the girdle of the bride

Sami
Beiwe, goddess of fertility and sanity
Rana Niejta, goddess of spring and fertility

Slavic
Dzydzilelya, Polish goddess of love, marriage, sexuality and fertility
Jarilo, god of fertility, spring, the harvest and war
Kostroma, goddess of fertility
Mokoš, Old Russian goddess of fertility, the Mother Goddess, protector of women's work and women's destiny
Siebog, god of love and marriage
Svetovid, god of war, fertility, and abundance
Živa, goddess of love and fertility

Oceanian
Gedi (mythology), Fijian god of fertility, who taught mankind the use of fire
Makemake, Rapa Nui creator-god, associated with fertility
Tagroa Siria, Fijian god associated with fertility
Tangaroa, Rarotongan god of the sea and creation, associated with fertility

Hawaiian
Haumea, goddess of fertility and childbirth
Kamapua'a, demi-god of fertility
Laka, patron of the hula dance and god of fertility
Lono, god associated with fertility, agriculture, rainfall, and music
Nuakea, goddess of lactation

Indigenous Australian

Anjea, goddess or spirit of fertility
Birrahgnooloo, Kamilaroi goddess of fertility
Dilga, Karadjeri goddess of fertility and growth
Julunggul, Yolngu rainbow snake goddess associated with fertility, initiation, rebirth and the weather
Kunapipi, mother goddess and the patron deity of many heroes
Rainbow Serpent, creator god and god of rain and fertility
Ungud, snake god or goddess associated with rainbows and the fertility and erections of the tribe's shaman
Wollunqua, snake god of rain and fertility

See also

 The Dinner Party-this artwork features a place setting for Fertile Goddess.
 Fertility rite
Fertility and religion
 Earth Mother
 Religion and agriculture
 Agricultural spiritualism
Lists of deities in Sanamahism
 Earth goddess
 Fall of man#Agricultural revolution

References 

 
Mythological archetypes
Fertility deities